Richton-Perry County Airport  is a city-owned, public-use airport located two nautical miles (4 km) south of the central business district of Richton, a city in Perry County, Mississippi, United States. It is included in the National Plan of Integrated Airport Systems for 2011–2015, which categorized it as a general aviation facility.

Facilities and aircraft 
Richton-Perry County Airport covers an area of 55 acres (22 ha) at an elevation of 167 feet (51 m) above mean sea level. It has one runway designated 18/36 with an asphalt surface measuring 3,000 by 60 feet (914 x 18 m).

For the 12-month period ending November 17, 2011, the airport had 1,400 general aviation aircraft operations, an average of 116 per month. At that time there were two single-engine aircraft based at this airport.

In March 2015, the runway received $250,000 renovation and resurfacing.

See also 
 List of airports in Mississippi

References

External links 
 Aerial image as of February 1996 from USGS The National Map
 

Airports in Mississippi
Buildings and structures in Perry County, Mississippi
Transportation in Perry County, Mississippi